Sidney George Wilson  (born January 20, 1977) is an American musician. He is the turntablist for the heavy metal band Slipknot, in which he is designated #0.

Biography 
Sid Wilson was raised in Des Moines, Iowa. His parents are both from England. He performs in the American band Slipknot, and also tours as DJ Starscream, a name which is derived from the Transformers character of the same name. He is a fan of the Transformers franchise, and has Transformer tattoos. Musically within Slipknot, Wilson contributes scratching, sound effects, horrorlike noises as well as background noises/effects. When numbers were being assigned to each band member, he insisted on being the number zero since it epitomized filth. He is also known to stage dive in Slipknot's early years, and in 2008, he broke both his heels when he jumped ten feet from the stage. 

Outside Slipknot, Wilson has made a following in Japan as a jungle musician, under the pseudonym DJ Starscream, and is currently signed to the Japanese record label N2O Records. He collaborated with The Mad Capsule Markets vocalist Hiroshi Kyono on a song called "HAKAI (Destroy)" released on The Songs for Death Note the movie～the Last name Tribute～, a tribute album dedicated to the live action movie for the second Death Note film. A remix of the track also appeared on the Wagdug Futuristic Unity mini-album Nu Riot and 2008 album Hakai.

In August 2010, he toured with his solo band Sid of which he is the lead vocalist. The band's debut album Sid was released on September 13, 2011, via digital download. In 2013 he was a support act for Vamps at their shows in Los Angeles and New York.

Mask 
During his time with Slipknot, Wilson's mask has been, for the most part, based on gas masks. During the tour for Iowa, he wore gas masks that had been customized to resemble skulls. During the Subliminal Verses World Tour, Wilson grew his hair long and began to wear various masks that simply resembled skulls, shying away from the gas-mask concept. In promotional photos for All Hope is Gone and the tour for the album, Wilson changed his mask once again, this time, to resemble a robot, dedicated also for his love of the Transformers franchise. Later, he once again cut his hair short, this time into a Fauxhawk style, and dyed it red. The eyebrows of the mask are able to be animatronically controlled, allowing him to make various expressions.

After the death of bassist Paul Gray in 2010, and during the subsequent Memorial World Tour, Wilson, in keeping with the rest of the band, reverted to his old mask and red jump suit, worn during the self-titled album tour, as a tribute to Gray.

In 2013, Wilson announced a new mask which he debuted over the weekend at Ozzfest Japan in Tokyo. The mask was made by Ukrainian design studio Bob Basset. This and the subsequent masks made by Basset are all made of leather and have a style reminiscent of his earlier gas masks. The music video for Slipknot's single "The Devil in I" from their 2014 album .5: The Gray Chapter, features a mask with circular eye holes similar to those from his Iowa era mask, however these are covered by metal grills that resemble spatulas. The mask also has a removable metal plate that can be placed over the mouth, in which he has a sharp golden grill. Wilson's mask was drastically changed once again for the release of Slipknot's sixth album We Are Not Your Kind, becoming an animatronic death mask of his own face, covered partly by a large black hood and robe. This mask drew significant attention, though mostly positive, for being a drastic leap from the designs of any previous Slipknot masks and for being reminiscent of Emperor Palpatine aka Darth Sidious or a slasher villain.

Personal life 
Wilson met Kelly Osbourne at 1999's Ozzfest and quickly became very good friends. The two were confirmed to be in a romantic relationship not long after Wilson's 45th birthday in 2022. They had a baby boy together in late 2022, and they named their son Sidney, after his father.

Discography

With Slipknot 

Slipknot (1999)
Iowa (2001)
Vol. 3: (The Subliminal Verses) (2004)
All Hope Is Gone (2008)
.5: The Gray Chapter (2014)
We Are Not Your Kind (2019)
The End, So Far (2022)

As DJ Starscream 
 1996: Starscream Throwback Mix
 2003: Full Metal Scratch-It
 2003: Abunaii Sounds – Tataku On Your Atama
 2005: Sound Assault
 2005: Live at Konkrete Jungle New York City
 2006: The New Leader
 2008: This Is Full Metal Jungle Vol.1
 2017: King of the Jungle Vol.1 (with N8 Loc, Tony Markham, SK da' Junglist)

As SID 
 2011: SID
 2011: Repeat (with Keen)
 2018: Sexcapades of the Hopeless Robotic
 2019: Sexcapades of the Hopeless Robotic, Vol.2

With The Miami Vice Sound Crack 
 2012: Wac Tape
 2015: The Wac Tape (DJ Wonder Remix)

Other appearances 
 2002: Stone Sour (Stone Sour) turntables on tracks 2, 3 and 6
 2004: The Pre-Fix for Death (Necro)
 2006: The Songs for Death Note the movie～the Last name Tribute～ (with Hiroshi Kyono)
 2006: Modern Primitive Punk (KCUF)
 2006: None Of Us Are Saints (Lab 4)
 2007: Natas Productions (Rob Gee)
 2007: Nu Riot (Wagdug Futuristic Unity)
 2007: Live From Moonbase One Studios EP (Izzy Starchild And The Psychedelic Rose)
 2008: Impaled By Metal! Split (Impaler/Black Market Fetus) (recorded, mixed and mastered the Black Market Fetus portion)
 2008: Says...... (Rob Gee)
 2008: Hakai (Wagdug Futuristic Unity)
 2009: "A Song for Chi" (Fieldy)
 2009: "Legal Drug Addict" (thekeenone) as a producer
 2010: "Sample of A Solution" (Blue Felix) as a producer
 2010: AlienNation (Agony Of Defeat) (appears on the track T.S.S. (DIS))
 2011: Staple Foods (The 113th DJ)
 2012: "End of Us" (Prozak) from the album "Paranormal"
 2013: "Rock N Roll" (Avril Lavigne) (appears in the video as Sgt. Terror)
 2013: "The Underworld ft. La Coka Nostra, Tech N9ne, Army of the Pharoahs, Bizarre, Swifty McVay, Goondox, King Gordy & Sid Wilson" (Reel Wolf Presents) as a rapper
 2013: "Planning a Murder ft. So Sick Social Club & Sid Wilson" (Reel Wolf Presents) as a rapper
 2014: "Hello Darkness" (Big Herc) as producer
 2014: "Use and Abuse (ft. DJ Starscream)", an Avatar song on the album Hail the Apocalypse
 2015: "Timing Is Everything" (King Magnetic) from the album "Timing is Everything"
 2015: "Bukowski" (Semi Hendrix)
 2016: "Hail the Villains" feat. Psych Ward, Mr. Hyde, Necro, and Sid Wilson (Reel Wolf Presents) as a rapper
 2017: "Frag Out" feat. Baby Eazy E, Young Dirty Bastard, Mike ADHD, Bizarre, and Sid Wilson as a rapper
 2018: "Wanna Be Younk" (7ever) as a rapper (producer Nika Finch)
 2019: "SPC Skeath" (Crumbzilla)
 2019: "The Real Hardcore" (Schoolly D)
 2019: "Mood Swings" (Lucifena)
 2019: "Born Calizeans" (Krooked Treez)
 2020: "Walking With Lions" (Jamo Gang)
 2020: "I'm Not Clearing Shxt" (Ras Kass) as producer

Filmography 
 1999: Welcome to Our Neighborhood
 2002: Disasterpieces
 2002: Rollerball
 2006: Voliminal: Inside the Nine
 2008: Nine: The Making of "All Hope Is Gone"
 2009: Of the (sic): Your Nightmares, Our Dreams
 2010: (sic)nesses
 2011: Goat
 2016: Blood Bath
 2016: Officer Downe
 2017: Day of the Gusano: Live in Mexico
 2021: Paradise City

References

External links 

 Sid Wilson (official)
 Slipknot (official)
 The Miami Vice Sound Crack (official)

American DJs
American drum and bass musicians
American electronic musicians
Midwest hip hop musicians
Grammy Award winners
Living people
Musicians from Des Moines, Iowa
Roadrunner Records artists
American people of English descent
Slipknot (band) members
Electronic dance music DJs
1977 births